Caitlyn Edwards (born 27 June 1996) is a former Australian rules footballer who played for the Collingwood Football Club in the AFL Women's (AFLW).

Early life and state football
Edwards grew up in Thornlie, Western Australia, playing netball before getting into footy because her mother and brother played footy. When she was 10 she joined the local junior football club and at Thornlie played with Clem Smith. At the age of 14 she had to move to the women's team and in her first season won a premiership. Following that she joined WAWFL club East Fremantle with which she played for four years. In the 2016 season, she also juggled rugby commitments and relied on her from previous years for the AFLW draft.

During the off-season between the 2017 and 2018 AFLW seasons, Edwards played for East Fremantle and for RugbyWA club Palmyra.

AFL Women's career
Edwards made her debut in round 1, 2017, in the inaugural AFLW match at IKON Park against . she played every game of the inaugural season, but said at the end that there is a lot of room for improvement.

Collingwood re-signed Edwards for the 2018 season during the trade period in May 2017.

Following the 2018 season, Edwards retired from football to pursue her rugby career.

Statistics
Statistics are correct to the end of the 2018 season.

|- style="background-color: #eaeaea"
! scope="row" style="text-align:center" | 2017
|style="text-align:center;"|
| 1 || 7 || 2 || 2 || 37 || 19 || 56 || 10 || 14 || 0.3 || 0.3 || 5.3 || 2.7 || 8.0 || 1.4 || 2.0
|- 
! scope="row" style="text-align:center" | 2018
|style="text-align:center;"|
| 1 || 7 || 4 || 1 || 48 || 34 || 82 || 16 || 34 || 0.6 || 0.1 || 6.9 || 4.9 || 11.7 || 2.3 || 4.9
|- class="sortbottom"
! colspan=3| Career
! 14
! 6
! 3
! 85
! 53
! 138
! 26
! 48
! 0.4
! 0.2
! 6.1
! 3.8
! 9.9
! 1.9
! 3.4
|}

References

External links

 

Living people
1996 births
Collingwood Football Club (AFLW) players
Australian rules footballers from Perth, Western Australia
Sportswomen from Western Australia